Thai Rating and Information Services Co., Ltd. (TRIS) founded in 1993 as Thailand’s first credit rating agency. Initiated by Ministry of Finance and Bank of Thailand to facilitate the development of domestic bond market. Later renamed TRIS Corporation Limited in 2007. TRIS Rating Co., Ltd. was established as a separate company on 3 June 2002.

In November 2011 Standard & Poor's acquired a 5% stake in TRIS Corp, the parent company of TRIS Rating.
In June 2016, Standard & Poor's acquired a 49% stake in TRIS Rating.

References

External links
Official Website
Tris Rating Website
Credit Repair Directory

1993 establishments in Thailand
Financial services companies of Thailand
Credit rating agencies
Organizations established in 1993